Igor Stravinsky (1882–1971) was a Russian composer, pianist and conductor.

Stravinsky may also refer to:

Stravinsky (surname)
Stravinsky (crater), a crater on the planet Mercury
4382 Stravinsky, an asteroid
 Stravinsky (horse)